Wattle Island may refer to:

 Wattle Island (Antarctica)
 Wattle Island (Victoria)